Paul Underwood Kellogg (September 30, 1879 – November 1, 1958) was an American journalist and social reformer. He died at 79 in New York on November 1, 1958.

Life
He was born in Kalamazoo, Michigan, in 1879. After working as a journalist he moved to New York City to study at Columbia University.

Journalist
After university Kellogg worked for Charities magazine before carrying out an unprecedented, in-depth study of industrial life in Pittsburgh. Published as The Pittsburgh Survey (1910–14), it became a model for sociologists wishing to employ research to aid social reform. His studies which helped to abolish the seven-day work week.

Kellogg returned to Charities magazine, now retitled Survey magazine. He became editor in 1912 and over the next few years turned into America's leading social work journal.

Activist
An opponent of U.S. involvement in the First World War, Kellogg joined Jane Addams and Oswald Garrison Villard, to persuade Henry Ford, the American industrialist, to organize a peace conference in Stockholm. Ford came up with the idea of sending a boat of pacifists to Europe to determine if they could negotiate an agreement to end the war. He chartered the ship Oskar II, and it sailed from Hoboken, New Jersey, on December 4, 1915. The Ford Peace Ship reached Stockholm in January, 1916, and a conference was organized with representatives from Denmark, the Netherlands, Norway, Sweden and the United States.

In 1918 Kellogg became the chairman of the Foreign Policy Association in New York. By the 1920s, Kellogg had become appalled by the way people were being persecuted for their political beliefs, particularly by President Woodrow Wilson's appointee A. Mitchell Palmer. In 1920, Kellogg joined with Roger Baldwin, Norman Thomas, Crystal Eastman, Addams, Clarence Darrow, John Dewey, Abraham Muste, Elizabeth Gurley Flynn and Upton Sinclair to form the American Civil Liberties Union.

In 1927 Kellogg joined with John Dos Passos, Alice Hamilton, Addams, Upton Sinclair, Dorothy Parker, Ben Shahn, Edna St. Vincent Millay, Floyd Dell, George Bernard Shaw and H. G. Wells in an effort to prevent the execution of Nicola Sacco and Bartolomeo Vanzetti. Although Webster Thayer, the original judge, was officially criticized for his conduct at the trial, the execution took place on August 23, 1927.

References

Sources 
 Paul U. Kellogg and the Survey: Voices for Social Welfare and Social Justice by Clarke A. Chambers

External links
 
 
 History of Survey
 The Survey at the HathiTrust
 Finding aid for the Paul U. Kellogg papers at the Social Welfare History Archives, University of Minnesota Libraries.

American male journalists
Journalists from Michigan
1879 births
1958 deaths
American pacifists
Progressive Era in the United States
American social reformers
Writers from Kalamazoo, Michigan
Columbia University alumni